Jerry Cowley (born 11 November 1952) is an Irish barrister, medical doctor and politician.

Originally from Ballina, he lives in Mulranny, County Mayo. He was an Independent Teachta Dála (TD) for the Mayo constituency after being elected to Dáil Éireann at the 2002 general election. He served until losing his seat at the 2007 general election.

In April 2010, he joined the Labour Party. He was an unsuccessful candidate for that party in the Mayo constituency at the 2011 general election.

Cowley was an independent candidate for the Mayo constituency at the 2016 general election, but failed to get elected.

He is a former Mayo Person of the Year, and won a Rehab People of the Year Award in 1998.

References

External links
Jerry Cowley's official website

 

1952 births
Living people
Labour Party (Ireland) politicians
Members of the 29th Dáil
Irish barristers
Politicians from County Mayo
Irish general practitioners
Independent TDs
People from Ballina, County Mayo